London Zoo is the third studio album by English musician Kevin Martin under his alias The Bug. It was released on 7 July 2008 by Ninja Tune to widespread critical acclaim. The Wire named London Zoo the record of the year in its annual critics' poll.

Critical reception

At Metacritic, which assigns a weighted average score out of 100 to reviews from mainstream critics, the album received an average score of 90, based on 10 reviews, indicating "universal acclaim".

Track listing

Personnel
Credits adapted from liner notes.

 The Bug – production
 Kevin Metcalfe – mastering
 Fefe Talavera – artwork
 Claire Emeh – photography

Release history

References

External links
 
 London Zoo at Ninja Tune

2008 albums
Ninja Tune albums
Kevin Martin (British musician) albums